The Book of Pride: LGBTQ Heroes Who Changed The World is a 2019 book by Mason Funk. It contains interviews and biographies of members of the LGBT community and advocates compiled by The OUTWORDS Archive. It was published by HarperCollins. There is a mix of well-known and unsung heroes of the LGBT movement.

Interviews 

 Troy Perry, founder of the Metropolitan Community Church which affirms the lesbian, gay, bisexual, and transgender communities
 Fenton Johnson, writer and professor of English and LGBT Studies
 Evan Wolfson, attorney and gay rights advocate
 Diana Nyad, author, journalist, motivational speaker, and long-distance swimmer
 Dean Hamer, geneticist, author, and filmmaker
 Margarethe Cammermeyer, colonel in the Washington National Guard and became a gay rights activist
 Miss Major Griffin-Gracy, trans woman activist and community leader for transgender rights, with a particular focus on women of color
 Donna Sachet, drag actor, singer, community activist, fundraiser, spokesmodel, and writer
John S. James, pioneering US LGBT rights activist and the editor of AIDS Treatment News
 Shannon Minter, civil rights attorney and the legal director of the National Center for Lesbian Rights
 Karla Jay, professor and pioneer in the field of lesbian and gay studies
Gigi Raven Wilbur, bisexual rights activist and writer
K.C. Potter, Academic dean at Vanderbilt University instrumental in creating a safe place for gay students
Ada Bello, a founder of the Philadelphia chapter of the Daughters of Bilitis
Kylar William Broadus, founder the Trans People of Color Coalition in Missouri
Jewel Thai-Williams, founder of Jewel's Catch One, a black disco opened in 1973
 Alexei Romanoff, organizer of 1966 protests at the Black Cat Bar against police raids
Phyllis Randolph Frye, creator of the International Conference on Transgender Law and Employment in 1991
Eric Julber, lawyer who won One, Inc. v. Olesen
Jim Toy, LGBT activist who initiated the creation of the Lesbian-Gay Male Programs office at the University of Michigan
Mary Morten, activist and co-creator of The Nia Project: Images of African American Lesbians
Kay Lahusen, first openly gay American gay photojournalist
Jamison Green, transgender rights activist and author of Becoming A Visible Man
Diana Rivers, pioneer of women-only spaces and an organizer of women's conferences and festivals
Blackberri, singer-songwriter, composer, and HIV activist whose work includes "Beautiful Black Man," which was featured in Looking for Langston
James Credle, founder of the National Association of Black and White Men Together and the Newark LGBTQ Center

References 

2019 non-fiction books
Biographies about LGBT people
2010s LGBT literature
HarperCollins books